Grand Falls is a natural waterfall system located 30 miles (48.3 kilometers) northeast of Flagstaff, Arizona in the Painted Desert on the Navajo Nation. It is also called Chocolate Falls because of the color.

It dumps snow melt or seasonal rain into the Little Colorado River below. It is known for its extremely muddy flow, which is a major contributor of Little Colorado River opacity. Heavy rains or snow melt will produce spectacular viewing, photography, and sound, whereas a scarcity of water will produce only trickles or no flow at all.

Grand Falls was formed when lava from nearby Merriam Crater in the San Francisco volcanic field flowed into the Little Colorado River, creating a lava dam. The river was forced to reroute itself around the dam and Grand Falls formed where the river rejoins its original course.

The waterfall is remote and no major paved roads access it. In fact the closest road, Grand Falls Road, crosses the floor of the Little Colorado River and at times during the year, only a four-wheel-drive vehicle can traverse it. The falls are dormant for months of the year and reduced to only a drip. To access the falls a passenger car can reach the south side of the river. However, a four-wheel-drive vehicle is then required and only Navajo guides or experienced back-country people are advised to take the road across the river.

A Navajo Nation hiking permit is not required to visit the Falls. The site and the roads to it are located on the Navajo Nation so leaving the roads or trails is against Navajo Law.  Picnic benches are provided at the viewpoint. The trail is one-half mile long and easy.

References

Landforms of Coconino County, Arizona
Waterfalls of Arizona
Block waterfalls